Children of Light is a book by Robert Stone. Children of Light may also refer to:

 The Children of Light, a novel by H. L. Lawrence that was the basis for The Damned (1963 film)
 Children of Light, a fictional terrorist group; see List of criminal organizations in DC Comics
 "Children of Light", a song by Yes from the albums Keystudio and Keys to Ascension 2
 Children of Light, a composition by Karen Tanaka

See also
 Children of the Light (disambiguation)
 Child of Light, a video game
 Child of the Light, a 1991 novel by Janet Berliner and George Guthridge
 Daughters of Light, a 1999 book by Rebecca Larson
 War of the Sons of Light Against the Sons of Darkness, a military manual discovered among the Dead Sea Scrolls